The rufous antpitta (Grallaria rufula) was a species of bird in the family Grallaridae that, in 2020, was found to be a species complex made up of 13 visually similar, but distinct species. 

The members of the complex are:

 Perijá antpitta, Grallaria saltuensis
 Sierra Nevada antpitta Grallaria spatiator
 Muisca antpitta, Grallaria rufula sensu stricto
 Bicolored antpitta, Grallaria rufocinerea
 Chamí antpitta Grallaria alvarezi
 Equatorial antpitta Grallaria saturata
 Cajamarca antpitta Grallaria cajamarcae
 Chachapoyas antpitta Grallaria gravesi
 Panao antpitta Grallaria oneilli
 Junín antpitta Grallaria obscura
 Urubamba antpitta Grallaria occabambae
 Puno antpitta Grallaria sinaensis
 Bolivian antpitta Grallaria cochabambae

References

Sounds of many Grallaria rufula taxa  on www.xeno-canto.org.

rufous antpitta
Birds of the Northern Andes
rufous antpitta
Taxonomy articles created by Polbot
Birds by common name
Set index articles on animal common names